Myrtartona mariannae is a species of moth in the family Zygaenidae. It is only known from Milmerran in south-eastern Queensland.

The wings are elongate. The forewing is slender and somewhat triangular, while the hindwing is almost rectangular but rounded
Apically. The forewing upperside and underside are greyish brown. The hindwing is dark grey with a brownish tinge, but slightly paler medially.

Etymology
The species is named for Marianne Horak.

References

Moths described in 2005
Endemic fauna of Australia
Procridinae